The One Park Taipei, also known as Da-An Tower, is a complex of residential twin skyscrapers located in Daan District, Taipei, Taiwan. The towers were designed by the British architectural firm Rogers Stirk Harbour + Partners and were completed in 2018. The location of the complex is adjacent to the Daan Forest Park.

Awards
The complex has won several awards:
CTBUH 2019 Award of Excellence: Best Tall Building 100-199 meters 2019 Award of Excellence
International Design Excellence Awards
International Design Awards (IDA): Gold in Interior Design / Exterior Lighting
Spark Awards
German Design Award: Special 2019

See also 
 List of tallest buildings in Taiwan
 List of tallest buildings in Taipei

References

External List
Official Website of One Park Taipei (in Chinese) 
Architizer article of One Park Taipei

2018 establishments in Taiwan
Residential buildings completed in 2018
Residential skyscrapers in Taiwan
Skyscrapers in Taipei
Twin towers